Oumoul Khairy Sarr (born 25 January 1984) is a Senegalese basketball player for IDK Gipuzkoa and the Senegalese national team.

She participated at the 2017 Women's Afrobasket.

References

External links

1984 births
Living people
Senegalese women's basketball players
Basketball players from Dakar
Power forwards (basketball)
Centers (basketball)
Expatriate basketball people in Ecuador
Senegalese expatriate sportspeople in Ecuador
Senegalese expatriate basketball people in Spain